Aldo Casera (31 July 1920 – 1 May 1999) was an Italian professional golfer. He was one of the leading Italian golfers of the post-WWII period.

Together with Alfonso Angelini and Ugo Grappasonni they founded the Professional Golfer's Association of Italy in 1962.

Professional wins (6)
1948 Italian Open, Italian Native Open
1949 Italian Native Open
1950 Swiss Open
1956 Italian Native Open
1965 Lancia d'Oro

Results in major championships

Note: Casera only played in The Open Championship.

CUT = missed the half-way cut
"T" indicates a tie for a place

Team appearances
Continental Europe–United States: (representing Continental Europe): 1953
Canada Cup (representing Italy): 1954, 1958
Joy Cup (representing the Rest of Europe): 1954, 1955, 1956, 1958

References

External links

Italian male golfers
Sportspeople from the Province of Imperia
People from Sanremo
1920 births
1999 deaths